The 2014 Internationaux de Tennis de Blois is a professional tennis tournament played on clay courts. It is the second edition of the tournament which is part of the 2014 ATP Challenger Tour. It takes place in Blois, France between 9 and 15 June 2014.

Singles main-draw entrants

Seeds

 1 Rankings are as of May 26, 2014.

Other entrants
The following players received wildcards into the singles main draw:
  Tristan Lamasine
  Laurent Lokoli
  Fabrice Martin
  Gianni Mina

The following players received entry from the qualifying draw:
  Gleb Sakharov
  Duilio Beretta
  Mathieu Rodrigues
  Enzo Couacaud

Doubles main-draw entrants

Seeds

1 Rankings as of May 26, 2014.

Other entrants
The following pair received wildcards into the doubles main draw:
  Mathieu Rodrigues /  Thomas Rodrigues

Champions

Singles

  Máximo González def.  Gastão Elias, 6–2, 6–3

Doubles

  Tristan Lamasine /  Laurent Lokoli def.  Guillermo Durán /  Máximo González, 7–5, 6–0

External links
Official Website

Internationaux de Tennis de Blois
Internationaux de Tennis de Blois
Internationaux de Tennis de Blois